Events from the year 1142 in Ireland.

Incumbents
High King: Toirdelbach Ua Conchobair

Events

Foundation of the first Cistercian house in Ireland at Mellifont, on land given by the King of Airgíalla. Abbey completed in 1157. The Cistercians were brought into Ireland by Saint Malachy

Deaths
Conchobar Ua Briain, a ruler of the kingdoms of Munster and Dublin.

References